Schoenocaulon is a North American genus of perennial herbaceous flowering plants, ranging from the southern United States to Peru. It is a member of the Melanthiaceae, according to the APG III classification system, and is placed in the tribe Melanthieae. Unlike other genera in the tribe, the flowers are arranged in a spike; depending on the species the flower stalks for each flower are either very short or completely absent. Feathershank is a common name, the medicinally used S. officinale is called Sabadilla (pronunciation: /sab-uh-dil-uh/, IPA: /ˌsæb əˈdɪl ə/).

Plants generally grow in chaparral, oak, or pine forests. Grazing has narrowed the natural ranges of some species to only steep, rocky terrain. Mexico is the center of Schoenocaulon diversity, with 22 endemic species - some with distributions limited to single mountain ranges. The two species with the widest distributions, S. yucatanense (sometimes treated as part of S. ghiesbreghtii) and S. officinale (sabadilla), may have been spread by pre-Columbians who used the seeds as pesticides.

The petal and sepal color varies by species, with some shade of green being most common, but with maroon, cream, and bright red also represented.

 species

References

 
Melanthiaceae genera
Flora of Mexico
Flora of Central America
Flora of the South-Central United States
Flora of the Southern United States
Flora of northern South America
Taxa named by Asa Gray
Flora without expected TNC conservation status